The 2015–16 Old Dominion Monarchs men’s basketball team represented Old Dominion University during the 2015–16 NCAA Division I men's basketball season. The Monarchs, led by third year head coach Jeff Jones, played their home games at the Ted Constant Convocation Center as members of Conference USA. They finished the season 25–13, 12–6 in C-USA play to finish in a three way tie for third place. They defeated Florida Atlantic, Louisiana Tech, and WKU to advance to the championship game of the C-USA tournament where they lost to Middle Tennessee. The received an invitation to the inaugural Vegas 16, which only had eight teams, where they defeated Tennessee Tech, UC Santa Barbara, and Oakland to become Vegas 16 champions.

Previous season
The Monarchs finished the 2013–14 season 27–8, 13–5 in C-USA play to finish in a tie for second place, after reaching as high as 13–1 to start the season, and being ranked in the AP Top 25 for the first time in program history. They lost in the quarterfinals of the C-USA tournament to Middle Tennessee. They were invited to the National Invitation Tournament where they defeated Charleston Southern in the first round, Illinois State in the second round, and Murray State in the quarterfinals to advance to the semifinals where they lost to Stanford.

Pre-season

Departures

Incoming transfers

2015 recruiting class

Roster

Schedule

|-
!colspan=12 style=| Exhibition

|-
!colspan=12 style=| Non-conference regular season

|-
!colspan=12 style=| Conference USA regular season

|-
!colspan=12 style=| Conference USA tournament

|-
!colspan=12 style=| Vegas 16

References

Old Dominion Monarchs men's basketball seasons
Old Dominion
Old Dominion
Old Dominion
Vegas 16 Tournament championship seasons
Old Dominion